LHS 3844 b is an exoplanet orbiting the red dwarf LHS 3844, about  away in the constellation Indus, discovered using the Transiting Exoplanet Survey Satellite. It orbits its parent star once every 11 hours, and its radius is 1.32 times that of Earth. It has a low albedo, indicating that its surface may resemble that of the Moon or Mercury. The presence of cloudy atmosphere with cloud tops above pressure level of 0.1 bar cannot be excluded though.

In order to explain the lack of atmosphere, it has been proposed that the planet was formed interior to the star system's snow-line, because if it formed beyond the snow-line it would have carried volatiles, on the surface and in a thick atmosphere, that according to models on atmospheric loss should have been enough to sustain an atmosphere to the present. The planet probably also formed with a volatile-poor outgassing mantle, in a stagnant lid regime, because if the mantle was similar in constitution to Earth's, with plate tectonics, then it should still have a thick atmosphere, unless the red dwarf consistently flared at an uncharacteristically extreme rate not yet considered in atmospheric loss models. An alternative explanation for the lack of atmosphere could be through a large impact event, one with enough momentum to strip the planet of its atmosphere and a large portion of its mantle. In order to explain the non replenishment of volatiles via comets back onto the planet, it is also proposed that perhaps there is an outer gas giant in the star system.

In August 2022, this planet and its host star were included among 20 systems to be named by the third NameExoWorlds project.

See also 
 List of exoplanets discovered in 2019

References 

Exoplanets discovered in 2018
Transiting exoplanets
Terrestrial planets
Indus (constellation)
Exoplanets discovered by TESS